Igor Morozov (born 27 May 1989) is an Estonian football manager and former professional footballer who played as a centre back.

Club career

Levadia
Morozov came through the youth system at Levadia. He won two Meistriliiga titles in 2008 and 2009, and was named Meistriliiga Player of the Year in 2012.

Polonia Warsaw
On 15 January 2013, it was announced that Morozov had signed a two-and-a-half-year contract with Ekstraklasa club Polonia Warsaw.

Debrecen
On 5 July 2013, Morozov signed a three-year contract with Nemzeti Bajnokság I club Debrecen. He won the Hungarian league title in the 2013–14 season.

Return to Levadia
On 18 February 2016, Morozov rejoined Levadia on a two-year contract. In January 2020, he was registered for the club's reserve team, FCI Levadia II, where he also would be to assistant coach under head coach Robert Sadovski, which he already worked with as an assistant coach for the U14 and U16 teams of Levadia during the 2018-19 season.

International career
Morozov made his senior international debut for Estonia on 31 May 2008, in 0–1 loss to Lithuania at the Baltic Cup.

Honours

Club
FCI Levadia
Meistriliiga: 2008,  2009
Estonian Cup: 2009–10, 2011–12, 2017–18
Estonian Supercup: 2010, 2018

Debrecen
Nemzeti Bajnokság I: 2013–14

Individual
Meistriliiga Player of the Year: 2012
Meistriliiga Fans Player of the Year: 2012

References

External links
 
 
 
 
 

1989 births
Living people
Footballers from Tallinn
Estonian people of Russian descent
Estonian footballers
Association football defenders
Esiliiga players
FCI Levadia U21 players
Meistriliiga players
FCI Levadia Tallinn players
Ekstraklasa players
Polonia Warsaw players
Nemzeti Bajnokság I players
Debreceni VSC players
Estonia youth international footballers
Estonia under-21 international footballers
Estonia international footballers
Estonian expatriate footballers
Expatriate footballers in Poland
Expatriate footballers in Hungary
Estonian expatriate sportspeople in Poland
Estonian expatriate sportspeople in Hungary
Estonian football managers